Flaming Gold is a 1933 American pre-Code drama film directed by Ralph Ince and written by Malcolm Stuart Boylan and John F. Goodrich. The film stars William Boyd, Pat O'Brien, Mae Clarke, Rollo Lloyd and Helen Ware. The film was released on September 29, 1933, by RKO Pictures.

Plot
Dan Manton and Ben Lear are partners in an oil drilling operation in Mexico. The object of sabotage from competitors, the tables are turned when the competitor's rigs catch fire. After the fires are under control, local saloon owner Tampico Tess Terrill recruits Martin and Lear to help her develop a similar oil operation.

Cast 
 William Boyd as Dan Manton
 Pat O'Brien as Ben Lear
 Mae Clarke as Claire Gordon
 Rollo Lloyd as Harry Banning
 Helen Ware as Tampico Tess Terrell
 Robert McWade as Bill Conway

References

External links 
 
 
 
 

1933 films
American black-and-white films
1930s English-language films
RKO Pictures films
Films directed by Ralph Ince
1933 drama films
American drama films
1930s American films